The Bag O'Nails was a live music club and meeting place for musicians in the 1960s and situated at 9 Kingly Street, Soho, London, England.

Bands and other musicians who played and socialised there included Georgie Fame, Jimi Hendrix, Bobby Tench, The Gass and Eric Burdon. The venue also hosted an early gig by the Jimi Hendrix Experience and others frequented the venue including Tom Jones, The Who and The Animals.

After the Beatles' recording sessions in London, their roadie Mal Evans, personal assistant Neil Aspinall and Paul McCartney would eat at The Bag O'Nails and it was one of their favourite venues. McCartney met his future wife Linda Eastman at the club on 15 May 1967; Justin Hayward of The Moody Blues met his future wife Ann Marie Guirron there as well. Another event is recorded in Mal Evans's memoirs: "January 19 and 20: I ended up drunk in The Bag O'Nails with McCartney and Aspinall". Mireille Strasser met Peter Noone (Herman's Hermits) at The Jimi Hendrix Experience in 1967. They married November 5, 1968

The Bag O'Nails re-opened as a private members' club in March 2013, before closing in 2018. It is now the site of a members' club called The Court.

Notes

References
 
 
 

Music venues in London
Nightclubs in London
Soho, London